The Rural Municipality of Rosemount No. 378 is a rural municipality (RM) in the Canadian province of Saskatchewan within Census Division No. 12 and  Division No. 6.

History 
The RM of Rosemount No. 378 incorporated as a rural municipality on December 12, 1910.

Geography

Communities and localities 
The following unincorporated communities are within the RM.

Localities
 Cando (dissolved as a village, December 31, 2005)
 Lett
 Naseby
 Palo
 Salter
 Traynor

Demographics 

Attractions 
 Whitehorse Lake
 Oban Lake

Government 
The RM of Rosemount No. 378 is governed by an elected municipal council and an appointed administrator that meets on the second Wednesday of every month. The reeve of the RM is Albert L. Kammer while its administrator is Kara Kirilenko. The RM's office is located in Landis.

Transportation 
 Saskatchewan Highway 4
 Saskatchewan Highway 14
 Saskatchewan Highway 656
 Canadian Pacific Railway

See also 
List of rural municipalities in Saskatchewan

References 

Rosemount